Girls Nite Out is a 1982 American slasher film written and produced by Anthony N. Gurvis, directed by Robert Deubel, and starring Julia Montgomery, Suzanne Barnes, Rutanya Alda, and Hal Holbrook. The film focuses on a group of college coeds who are targeted by a killer in a bear mascot costume during an all-night scavenger hunt on their campus.

Shot at Upsala College in New Jersey, the film received a small regional theatrical release under the alternate title The Scaremaker in December 1982, before being subsequently released under the better-known Girls Nite Out title in 1983.

Plot
At Weston Hills Sanitarium in rural Ohio, psychiatric patient Dickie Cavanaugh commits suicide by hanging himself. Cavanaugh's sister gives permission to two gravediggers to bury the body. While the two men are digging the hole for Cavanaugh's body, they are attacked and murdered by an unseen killer who throws their corpses into the burial plot.

Meanwhile, at nearby DeWitt University, the basketball team wins a championship game, and as a result, an all-night scavenger hunt will take place the next evening for the female students. Lynn and her boyfriend-star player Teddy Ratliff celebrate the victory at the campus diner, and the waitress Barney is thrilled for the team. Lynn, Teddy, and other students attend a party that evening, where the story of Dickie circulates among freshmen who are unaware of his recent death; they are told that Cavanaugh murdered his girlfriend Patty in a jealous rage and is locked away in the sanitarium. Lynn becomes jealous over Teddy's attraction to Dawn Sorenson and misfit Mike Pryor gets into a fight with his girlfriend Sheila. Soon, school mascot Michael Benson is stabbed in his dorm room after arriving back from the party, and his bear mascot costume is stolen by the killer.

The following day, Mike Pryor is questioned by campus security officer Jim MacVey over the fight with his girlfriend; MacVey's daughter Patty was Dickie Cavanaugh's girlfriend. Later that evening, the campus radio DJ broadcasts the clues to the scavenger hunt, which are received by the girls on their portable radios. Meanwhile, the killer who is dressed in the bear costume, is armed with serrated knives mimicking bear claws.

Jane enters the girls' locker room and locates the first item of the hunt, only to be attacked from behind by the killer, who brutally slashes her throat while calling her misogynistic slurs. Shortly after, Kathy discovers Jane's body crudely strung up in the locker room showers. Kathy tries to flee before also having her throat slashed. The DJ at the radio station begins receiving phone calls from the killer, who tallies his victims; the killer also calls officer MacVey and claims to be Dickie Cavanaugh. Sheila goes down to the pond to search for another item and runs into the bear-clad killer, whom she believes to be Benson. Teasing him, she goes into an abandoned shed by the pond. While inside the shed, the killer smashes their hand through the window, slashing Sheila's throat.

Meanwhile, Lynn continues searching for items on the scavenger hunt, while Teddy visits Dawn at her apartment, where the two have sex. Lynn's friend Leslie goes to search for an item in the attic of the old chapel, where she is murdered and her body is discovered by Lynn. After calling, the police arrive and find all of the bodies, where they are suspicious of Mike Pryor and question several of the students. Dawn gets into an argument with her boyfriend, who kicks her out of their house after he tells her he knows about her affair with Teddy. Officer MacVey studies the phone calls placed to the radio station as well as files and photographs of Dickie Cavanaugh, whose death he became aware of by Dickie's doctor.

While walking home, Dawn senses that someone is following her and has a panic attack. She uses a payphone outside the student union to call Teddy's house, where he is consoling Lynn. The phone call is incomprehensible, and ends with Dawn screaming, followed by a gruff voice invoking Teddy to "come and get her." Lynn calls the police while Teddy flees to the student union. Once there, he finds Dawn bloody and wounded in the cafeteria. As Teddy is comforting her, he is stabbed by Barney, who reveals herself as the killer. Officer MacVey enters the cafeteria and confronts Barney, whom he addresses as Dickie's twin sister, Katie Cavanaugh. Katie, apparently suffering from dissociative identity disorder, responds to MacVey in alternating voices, claiming to be Dickie. After MacVey tells Katie that Dickie is dead, she reverts, and calmly tells him that Dickie is not dead, and that she brought him home from the hospital. She opens the freezer, displaying Dickie's frozen body clothed in a wheelchair and with the bear-claw weapon in his hand.

Cast

Production

Filming

Girls Nite Out was shot in early 1982 in Dobbs Ferry, New York, and at Upsala College in East Orange, New Jersey. Director Deubel had previously worked as a documentarian, while the film's producers, Anthony N. Gurvis and Kevin Kurgis, were two attorneys from Ohio who helped finance the film.

According to actress Rutanya Alda, the principal film shoot spanned a period of only three days due to budgetary and location restrictions, and most scenes were shot in one to two takes. Due to the fact that the film was shot on a real college campus, the filmmakers were forced to shoot over a weekend. The shoot began on a Friday and concluded on a Sunday, meaning the cast and crew had to work for twenty-four-hour intervals. Alda stated that the final shot of the film in which Dickie's corpse is revealed freezer (which Alda herself played) was shot after the principal shoot. In a 2013 interview, Alda claimed that the producers of the film still owed her $5,000 for her work that they never paid her for.

Music
The film soundtrack is composed of several oldies hits by the Lovin' Spoonful, the Ohio Express, 1910 Fruitgum Co., John Fred & the Playboy Band and others.

Release
The film first received a regional theatrical release under the title The Scaremaker on December 3, 1982 in several Southern U.S. cities, such as Jackson, Tennessee and Clarksville, Mississippi. The film continued to screen regionally under this title through early 1983, as a double bill with Blood Beach. It was re-released in late 1983 under the title Girls Nite Out, opening under this title in Detroit, Michigan on October 8, 1983 as a double bill with Pieces (1982). In the United Kingdom and Ireland, the film was released in December 1986, with twenty-two seconds excised from the original cut.

Critical response 
Variety described the film as "a routine slasher picture, offering little entertainment..." Scott Cain of The Atlanta Constitution wrote that the film "has all the predictable ingredients...  There must be 50 supporting roles and, as a consequence, none of the characters has much chance to make a favorable impression." Mike Hughes of the Hattiesburg American wrote: "By horror standards, it's almost adequate...  Where they failedthoroughlywas in their frequent passes at campus humor...  Where they succeeded was in filming the story smoothly and giving it a solid cast."

In a 1998 review, the Blockbuster Entertainment Guide to Movies and Videos awarded the film two out of four stars.

There have been numerous retrospective reviews of the film published after its initial release. Online movie guide AllMovie awarded the film two out of five stars, writing: "Girls Nite Out might be one of the most forgettable of the early '80s slashers", calling it "dull" and "routine". Bill Gibron, writing for DVD Talk in 2005, called the film a "poor excuse for entertainment holds the grand distinction of hosting two members of the Holbrook family (Hal and son David) as part of its cast," also criticizing the lack of variety among the murder scenes, and adding: "In the end, when the slayer is revealed, we rest easier knowing that it takes a certain strangled mindset to turn serial killer and that we are safe—at least for now. Girls Nite Out offers none of this nuance. Instead, we get boredom on top of balderdash, never a good fright night combination."

Film scholar John Stanley awarded the film two-and-a-half out of four stars, writing: "This imitation of Friday the 13th (originally shot as The Scaremaker) is strengthened only by the presence of Hal Holbrook as a campus security chief." Steven Scheuer in Movies on TV '88-'89 referred to the film as "bloody and borderline offensive" and deemed the villain's costume "simply laughable," ultimately giving the film a one-star rating. Critic James J. Mulay gave the film zero stars in The Horror Film: A Guide to More Than 700 Films on Videocassette (1989), noting the film's surprise ending but that it overall "scarcely succeeds," also criticizing the film's actors, who he deemed "old enough to be teaching higher education."

Home media
Girls Nite Out was released for the first time on DVD by Media Blasters on August 30, 2005, as part of the company's "Slasher Collection" series. The release features an interview with actress Julia Montgomery, as well as the film's theatrical trailer and original opening titles bearing the film's original title of The Scaremaker.

Arrow Video released the movie on Bluray in the US,Canada & UK on 22 May 2022.

References

Sources

External links
 
 
 

1982 films
1982 independent films
1980s mystery films
1980s serial killer films
1980s slasher films
1980s teen horror films
American mystery films
American serial killer films
American slasher films
American teen horror films
Films set in Ohio
Films set in universities and colleges
Films shot in New Jersey
Films shot in New York (state)
1980s English-language films
1980s American films